William Stevens Lawton (May 16, 1900 – February 26, 1993) was a lieutenant general in the United States Army and served as the Army's Comptroller.

Early life
Lawton was born on May 16, 1900, in Newport, Rhode Island, and graduated from Newport's Rogers High School in 1917.

From 1917 to 1918, Lawton attended Worcester Polytechnic Institute.  He then transferred to the United States Military Academy, graduating in 1922.

Start of military career
In 1923, Lawton graduated from both the Army's Primary Flying School and its Advanced Flying School Special Observation Course.

After completing his aviator qualification, Lawton was assigned to Coastal Artillery Corps postings, including Fort Adams, Rhode Island.

Lawton graduated from the Artillery School Battery Officer Course in 1930.  He then carried out Coastal Artillery postings throughout the US and overseas, including the 61st Coast Artillery Battalion at Fort Sheridan, Illinois, assignment to the Philippines, and a tour of duty at Fort Winfield Scott.

In 1939, Lawton graduated from both the Chemical Warfare Field Officer Course and the Command and General Staff College.

World War II
From 1941 to 1943, Lawton was Assistant Deputy Chief of Staff of the Army's Hawaiian Department.  He was present at the attack on Pearl Harbor and later gave Congressional testimony about his experience and observations.

Lawton was Deputy Chief of Staff US Army Forces Mid-Pacific, with duty in Hawaii from 1943 to 1946.

Post-World War II
In 1947, Lawton was appointed Assistant Commandant of the Army's Field Artillery School and Commandant of the school's Seacoast Branch.

From 1950 to 1951, Lawton served as Chief of Staff of Army Field Forces, with duty at Fort Monroe, Virginia.

In 1952, Lawton was assigned as Deputy Chief of Staff for Civil Relations at the US Far East Command, serving until 1953.

Korean War
Lawton was appointed to command the Korean Communication Zone in 1953, and served in this position until 1954.  In this high profile rear echelon command, Lawton took steps to improve the perception of the US military among South Korean civilians by implementing Operation Good Will, a successful effort to generate from members of the US military and American civilians contributions of money and other needed items for orphanages, schools and other institutions.

Post-Korean War
In 1955, Lawton was assigned as Director of the Budget Division in the Army's Office of the Comptroller.

Lawton was named Comptroller of the Army in 1957, serving until his retirement from the military.

From 1958 to 1959, he served as President of the Association of Military Comptrollers.

General Lawton retired in 1960.

Awards and decorations
His awards and decorations included multiple awards of the Distinguished Service Medal and the Legion of Merit, as well as the Bronze Star Medal.

In 1973, General Lawton was inducted into the Lambda Chi Alpha fraternity's Order of Achievement.

Subsequent career
After leaving the Army, Lawton resided in Bethesda, Maryland.  He accepted a position as Vice President and Vice Chairman of the Board for Government Loan Services Savings and Loan Association, Inc., where he remained until retiring in the 1980s.  In 1989 Lawton moved to the Fairfax retirement community at Fort Belvoir, Virginia, where he died February 26, 1993.

See also

List of lieutenant generals in the United States Army before 1960

References

External links

1900 births
1993 deaths
United States Army generals
United States Military Academy alumni
United States Army Command and General Staff College alumni
United States Army personnel of World War II
United States Army personnel of the Korean War
Recipients of the Distinguished Service Medal (US Army)
Recipients of the Legion of Merit
People from Newport, Rhode Island
People from Bethesda, Maryland
Worcester Polytechnic Institute alumni